Stratton Rollins Heath Jr. (born December 28, 1937) is an American politician and former state legislator in the U.S. state of Colorado who previously served as the Colorado State Senate Assistant Minority Leader. Elected to the Colorado State Senate as a Democrat in 2008, Heath represented Senate District 18, which encompasses Boulder, Colorado and portions of Boulder County. Heath served as State Senate Majority Caucus Leader from October 2013 to 2014. Prior to winning elective office, Heath was the founding chairman of ProgressNow, a progressive advocacy organization. Term limited, he did not run for re-election in the 2016 elections, so his term ended in January 2017.  Heath is a member of the Unitarian Universalist Church of Boulder.

Political career
Heath was the Democratic nominee for governor in 2002. He lost to incumbent Republican governor Bill Owens.

Legislative career

2008 election

Heath faced University of Colorado Regent Cindy Carlisle in the August 12, 2008, 18th District Democratic primary, defeating her 56% to 44%.

Heath was unopposed in the November 2008 general election. Heath's candidacy was endorsed by the Denver Post and the Boulder Daily Camera.

Colorado General Assembly

For the 2009 session of the Colorado General Assembly, Heath was named to seats on the Senate Business, Labor, and Technology Committee, the Senate Education Committee, and the Senate Finance Committee.

In November 2008, Heath was named to a special legislative Committee on Job Creation and Economic Growth, tasked with developing recommendations on bolstering Colorado's economy before the 2009 legislative session. Heath has sponsored legislation to re-instate the Colorado Credit Reserve program to assist small businesses in obtaining loans, and in 2008 announced plans to sponsor legislation to provide matching funds to startup companies in the "clean energy" field.

On October 9, 2013, Heath was elected as Majority Leader of the Colorado State Senate after the preceding Majority Leader Morgan Carroll was elected to replace recalled Colorado State Senator John Morse as president of the Colorado Senate.

References

External links
 
 Rollie Heath at Colorado General Assembly
 Rollie Heath at Project Vote Smart
 

1937 births
Democratic Party Colorado state senators
Living people
2016 United States presidential electors
University of Wisconsin Law School alumni
21st-century American politicians
Candidates in the 2002 United States elections